Arellano University is a large university in Manila, Philippines.

Arellano may also refer to:

 Arellano (surname)
 Arellano, Navarre, a municipality in Navarre, Spain